Ebbe Sand (born 19 July 1972) is a former professional footballer from Denmark who played as a forward for Brøndby IF in Denmark and FC Schalke 04 in Germany. He was the Bundesliga top scorer in 2001, and won the DFB-Pokal in 2001 and 2002 with Schalke. On the international stage, he represented the Denmark national team at the 1998 and 2002 FIFA World Cup, as well as the 2000 and 2004 European Championships. At the 1998 World Cup, he scored the fastest-ever World Cup goal by a substitute – 16 seconds after entering the match.

In all, he was selected 66 times for the Danish national team and scored 22 goals, from his debut in 1998 until he decided to focus on playing for Schalke in 2004. When his contract with Schalke ran out in summer 2006, he moved back to Denmark to become head talent scout at Silkeborg IF. At his retirement in 2006, he was granted a testimonial match between the Danish national team and his former Danish club Brøndby IF.

Biography
Born in Aalborg and raised in Hadsund, Denmark, he started playing for hometown club Hadsund BK alongside his twin brother Peter Sand. Moving to Copenhagen in order to study building engineering at the Technical University of Denmark, he and his brother Peter decided to try their luck at Brøndby IF. After three years of playing only a few games as attacking midfielder, Sand got a chance to play regularly in 1995 and he soon made a name for himself. His brother would never play for Brøndby, but played professionally for a number of other clubs.

National breakthrough
He scored 12 goals in 29 games in his breakthrough season and helped Brøndby win the Danish Superliga title. Brøndby matched that feat in both 1997 and 1998, with 1998 being an even better year for both Sand and Brøndby. Sand won the Danish Golden Boot as he scored 28 goals in 33 games and helped Brøndby win the Danish Cup, completing the Double. Sand was first capped for the Denmark national football team on 22 April 1998 against Norway, and following his great 1998 season, he was selected to play for Denmark in the 1998 FIFA World Cup.

He took part in all five Denmark matches at the World Cup, and scored his first goal for Denmark in the game against Nigeria, his own most treasured goal for the national team. Entering as a substitute, he ran into the blind spot of the defense, had the ball lobbed to him over the heads of the defenders by Michael Laudrup, before he headed the ball to his right, past the Nigerian Taribo West, and slotted the ball home in the lower left corner. It only took 16 seconds from his substitution to his goal, a World Cup record that still stands. Following his break through on the international stage, he was named Danish Player of the Year. In 1998, Sand was diagnosed with testicular cancer. He had the cancer removed and was back in action just a few weeks after the operation.

Club career abroad
Following the 1998 World Cup, Sand played one more season for Brøndby, in which he scored another 19 goals. He was then transferred to German club Schalke for 10 million DEM in 1999, at that time the most expensive sale by a Danish club. Sand's first season in Germany was successful, as he scored 14 goals, although Schalke only finished 13th in the Bundesliga that year. After scoring four goals in the qualification matches, he played twice for Denmark at the Euro 2000 tournament, before he was benched in the last game of a lacklustre Danish performance.

The 2000–01 season was much more successful for Sand. Schalke finished second in the Bundesliga, after a goal from Bayern Munich four minutes into the added time, ruining Schalke's championship dreams. Despite this they qualified for the UEFA Champions League. They also won the DFB-Pokal. Sand scored 22 goals and tied with Sergej Barbarez for the title of lead topscorer in Germany, and he once again won the Danish Player of the Year award in 2001. Schalke won the DFB-Pokal again in 2002 and finished fifth in the league, with Sand tallying 11 goals. For the national team, he scored an impressive nine goals in ten qualification games for the 2002 FIFA World Cup, but he failed to impress at the final tournament, and was benched the last group match, although he did play three times.

His following years at Schalke would be less successful, as he only scored six and eight goals in the next two seasons, respectively. For Denmark's run in the Euro 2004, Sand missed Denmark's final game due to injury, and he decided to retire from international football. He cited a desire to focus his last active years on playing for Schalke, though he would be ready to re-enter the Denmark team if it qualified for 2006 FIFA World Cup tournament if his form would allow it, though that never became relevant for either party. Initially in his last year of contract, he prolonged his stay at Schalke by a year, despite only scoring eight goals in 2005. In July 2005, he announced the coming season as his last for Schalke and following seven years in Germany he would move to Denmark in order to work at Danish Superliga club Silkeborg IF. He thereby turned down an offer from Schalke manager Rudi Assauer to become his managerial protégé at Schalke. For his last season at Schalke he was chosen as team captain, even though stiff competition by fellow Dane Søren Larsen and German striker Kevin Kurányi relegated Sand's role to substitute player. He ended his Schalke career at the Bundesliga game with VfB Stuttgart on 13 May 2006, scoring a goal in the 3–2 Schalke victory before being substituted to a standing ovation by the spectators.

Management career
After retiring, Sand joined Silkeborg IF in several roles before joining the Denmark National Team as a forwards coach. He then joined Schalke 04 in an advisory role before he was confirmed as the Director of Football of Brøndby IF on 31 October 2018, a job which he took over on 1 January 2019. Shortly after becoming the Director of Football at Brøndby IF, he sacked head coach Alexander Zorniger following a string of bad results. On 10 July 2019, Brøndby IF announced, that they had hired Carsten V. Jensen as their new director of football and offered Sand a new position, which he had refused and therefore left the club.

Career statistics

Club

International

Scores and results list Denmark's goal tally first, score column indicates score after each Sand goal.

Honours
Brøndby IF
 Danish Superliga: 1995–96, 1996–97, 1997–98
 Danish Cup: 1997–98

Schalke 04
DFB-Pokal: 2000–01, 2001–02
UEFA Intertoto Cup: 2003
DFL-Ligapokal: 2005

Individual
 Danish Superliga top scorer: 1997–98 (28 goals)
 Danish Footballer of the Year: 1998, 2001
 Bundesliga top scorer: 2000–01 (22 goals, shared with Sergej Barbarez)

References

External links
 Danish national team profile 
 Brøndby IF Statistics 

1972 births
Living people
People from Hadsund
Sportspeople from Aalborg
Danish men's footballers
Association football forwards
Denmark international footballers
Brøndby IF players
FC Schalke 04 players
Danish Superliga players
Bundesliga players
Kicker-Torjägerkanone Award winners
1998 FIFA World Cup players
UEFA Euro 2000 players
2002 FIFA World Cup players
UEFA Euro 2004 players
Danish twins
Twin sportspeople
Denmark Series players
Danish expatriate men's footballers
Danish expatriate sportspeople in Germany
Expatriate footballers in Germany